The Country Stampede Music Festival is an outdoor country music and camping festival held at Heartland Motorsports Park, south of Topeka, Kansas. The festival has been held annually since 1996, historically on the last weekend in June (except in 2020 when it was cancelled due to the COVID pandemic).

The festival was held at Tuttle Creek State Park outside Manhattan, Kansas, from its founding in 1996 to 2018. The 2019 festival was moved to Topeka, initially due to potential flood conditions at Tuttle Creek Lake. Organizers announced the move would be permanent on June 20, 2019. Organizers also announced the name of the festival was changed to Heartland Stampede in advance of the 2020 festival. Like many large scale events, the festival was cancelled in 2020 due to the COVID-19 pandemic. In 2021, the festival would once again be named Country Stampede and had a successful 3-day event despite poor weather. Organizers announced on October 19th, 2021 that the 2022 festival would be moved to the month of July to attempt to avoid the history of severe weather during the event.

Country Stampede in Manhattan (1996–2018)

The Country Stampede festival was the largest annual music festival in Kansas while in Manhattan. Total combined attendance for all days exceeded 170,000 – in 2012 it was approximately 175,000. The record for largest single-day attendance was set on June 23, 2012, when an estimated 55,000 fans watched Toby Keith perform.

The festival began as a three-day weekend event, and then for several years was expanded to a four-day format, lasting from Thursday through Sunday. Camping was common for attendees, and 2,400 camp sites were available on the grounds. Vendors, and many activities were also present at the festival. 

Starting in 2016, the festival reverted to a three-day format.  The Thursday night kickoff party was expanded into a full-day format, while Sunday was dropped from the weekend. Festival President Wayne Rouse said the decision would allow attendees a day off to recover and travel. The new format was  well-received, and Rouse indicated the change would be permanent.

During this time, a sister festival was held at the Kentucky Speedway in Sparta, Kentucky in 2003 and 2004.

Past performers 
Notable musical artists performing at the festival in Manhattan include:

 Jason Aldean
 Gary Allan
 Dierks Bentley
 Big & Rich
 Clint Black
 Brooks and Dunn
 Brothers Osborne
 Kane Brown
 Luke Bryan
 Chris Cagle
 Deana Carter
 Charlie Daniels Band
 Kenny Chesney
 Cross Canadian Ragweed
 Sara Evans
 Florida Georgia Line
 Pat Green
 Faith Hill
 Julianne Hough
 Alan Jackson
 Kansas
 Toby Keith
 Miranda Lambert
 Chris LeDoux
 Little Big Town
 Lynyrd Skynyrd
 Maddie & Tae
 Martina McBride
 Delbert McClinton
 Reba McEntire
 Tim McGraw
 Montgomery Gentry
 Nitty Gritty Dirt Band
 Old Dominion
 Brad Paisley
 Rascal Flatts
 Thomas Rhett
 LeAnn Rimes
 Darius Rucker
 Sawyer Brown
 Mark Selby (musician)
 Chris Stapleton
 Steve Miller Band
 Styx
 Sugarland
 Taylor Swift
 Keith Urban
 Phil Vassar
 Clay Walker
 Hank Williams, Jr.
 Mark Wills
 Gretchen Wilson
 Trisha Yearwood
 Dwight Yoakam
 Brett Young
 Zac Brown Band
 ZZ Top

Country Stampede in Topeka (2019–present)

Move to Topeka and 2019 festival 
In May 2019, after severe rains caused increased water levels at Tuttle Creek Lake Dam, the organizers of Country Stampede announced on their Facebook page that the festival would move to Heartland Motorsports Park in Topeka for the June 2019 event as a measure to "ensure all of [the] concert goers will be out of harm's way".

Despite reassurances from the festival organizers on their FAQ page that the event would not permanently move from Manhattan, on June 20th, hours before the festival began, Country Stampede officials and leaders from the City of Topeka announced that the festival would permanently move to Heartland Motorsports Park for three additional years, renaming the festival to "Heartland Stampede", and terminating their contract with the Kansas Department of Wildlife, Parks, and Tourism to host the event at Tuttle Creek Lake State Park.

2019 headline performer Jason Aldean was forced to cancel his show due to severe weather.

Planned 2020 festival and cancellation 
In September of 2019, officials from the festival announced that Toby Keith, Luke Combs, and Cody Johnson would be the headlining performers for the 2020 festival, which was scheduled to take place from June 25th through the 27th.

In March of 2020, Heartland Stampede announced through their Facebook page that a local credit union, Azura, had become the new title sponsor for the 2020 festival.

In April, organizers stated that the event would still go on, but later backpedaled and cancelled the event entirely due to the COVID-19 pandemic in Kansas, even after attempting to reschedule the event. An FAQ from the event stated that tickets purchased for the 2020 event would be automatically transferred to the 2021 event, unless purchasers accessed a form and requested a refund between the cancellation date of April 30th and May 31st.

2021 festival 
In September 2020, the event, now renamed to "Country Stampede at the Heartland", announced that it would be partnering with a local company, VAERUS Aviation, to bring an airshow called "Thunder Over the Heartland" to the event on the final day of the 2021 festival, June 26th, as well as an additional day on Sunday the 27th, with attendees to Country Stampede receiving free shuttle transport between Heartland Motorsports Park and Topeka Regional Airport for the airshow, the 190th Air Refueling Wing based at Topeka Regional would be participating, as well as that individual tickets would go on sale immediately for people wishing to see the airshow, but are not attending the festival. The announcement also included an announcement that headlining artists at the 2021 event would be Luke Combs, Morgan Wallen, and Riley Green.

Past performers 
Notable musical artists performing at the festival in Topeka include:

 Clint Black
 Luke Combs
 Sam Hunt
 Old Dominion
 Jake Owen

See also
List of country music festivals
Country music

References

External links 
 Official Website
 Heartland Stampede facebook page
 Former Country Stampede website
 Former Country Stampede myspace profile

Folk festivals in the United States
Rock festivals in the United States
Music festivals established in 1996
Music festivals in Kansas
Country music festivals in the United States